Andre Afram Asmar is an American hip hop producer from Los Angeles, California.

Career
Andre Afram Asmar released the solo album, Race to the Bottom, on Mush Records in 2003.

He released Gawd Bless the Faceless Cowards, a collaborative album with rapper Circus, on Mush Records in 2004.

Discography

Albums
 The Living Zombeats (2000)
 Race to the Bottom (2003)
 Gawd Bless the Faceless Cowards (2004) with Circus
 Harmonic Emergency (2011)

EPs
 Asmar Beats Vol. 1 (1998)
 Transmigration (2003)

References

External links
 Andre Afram Asmar on Mush Records
 

Alternative hip hop musicians
American hip hop record producers
Musicians from California
People from Los Angeles
Living people
Record producers from California
Year of birth missing (living people)